Bryan Terry (born October 27, 1968) is an American doctor and politician from the state of Tennessee. A Republican, Terry has represented the 48th district of the Tennessee House of Representatives, based in eastern Murfreesboro, since 2015. He is the only Native American serving in that state's legislative body.

Early life
Terry was born in Oklahoma, where he went into his family's auto salvage business. After attending the University of Oklahoma and the University of Oklahoma College of Medicine, Terry worked as a doctor in both Oklahoma and Tennessee, including caring for victims of the Oklahoma City bombing in 1995.

Career
In 2014, Joe Carr, representative for the 48th district of the Tennessee House of Representatives, announced he would challenge Senator Lamar Alexander in the Republican primary for U.S. Senate. Despite being outspent, Terry won a highly contested primary to succeed Carr, earning 34% of the vote to his two opponents' 33%. Terry went on to win the general election easily.

Terry has not faced significant opposition since in his heavily Republican seat, winning handily in 2016 and 2018.

Personal life
Terry lives in Murfreesboro with his wife, Cheryl, and their 2 children. He is an enrolled member of the Choctaw Nation.

References

Living people
Republican Party members of the Tennessee House of Representatives
21st-century American politicians
1968 births
University of Oklahoma alumni
Choctaw Nation of Oklahoma people
Native American state legislators
People from Murfreesboro, Tennessee
20th-century Native Americans
21st-century Native Americans